Taking Off is the second solo album by Neil Innes and was released in 1977.

In 2005 the album was released on CD, paired with The Innes Book of Records.

Track listing
All songs written by Neil Innes
 "Crystal Balls" - 2:57
 "Catch Phrase" - 2:48
 "God is Love" - 3:42
 "Randy Raquel" - 3:23
 "Shangri-La" - 3:51
 "Drama On a Saturday Night" - 4:59
 "Dreams Shine Through" - 3:50
 "Busy Day" - 3:26
 "Three Piece Suite" - 3:35
 "La Vie En Rose" - 3:15

Personnel
 Neil Innes - vocals, piano, arrangements
 John Halsey - drums
 Timi Donald - drums
 Brian Hodgson - bass guitar
 Alan James - bass guitar
 Richard Lee - double bass
 Billy Bremner - guitar
 Roger Rettig - guitar, steel guitar
 John Megginson - piano, arrangements
 Julian Smedley - vocals, violin 
 Keith Nelson - banjo
 Willie Fahey - flute, saxophone
 Jon Field - congas
 Brian Bowles - vocals
 Sue Jones-Davies - vocals
Technical
Hugh Jones, Dave Charles - engineer

References 

1977 albums
Arista Records albums
Neil Innes albums
Albums produced by Neil Innes
Albums recorded at Rockfield Studios